A Just society is one in which each person is socially and economically secure, and where the state is politically, legally, and administratively inclusive and fair.

History 
The idea of a just society first gained modern attention when philosophers such as John Stuart Mill asked, "What is a 'just society'?" Their writings covered several perspectives including allowing individuals to live their lives as long as they didn't infringe on the rights to others, to the idea that the resources of society should be distributed to all, including those most deserving first. In 1861, John Stuart Mill published an essay entitled, "Utilitarianism". In this famous essay, Mill advocated the latter view, in which decision makers attended to the "common good" and all other citizens worked collectively to build communities and programs that would contribute to the good of others.

Canadian usage

The term was later used as a rhetorical device by Canadian Prime Minister Pierre Trudeau to encapsulate his vision for the nation.  He first used the term in the 1968 Liberal Party leadership contest, at the height of "Trudeaumania", and it eventually became identified as one of his trademark phrases.
Unlike the "Great Society" of US President Lyndon B. Johnson, the label "Just Society" was not attached to a specific set of reforms, but rather applied to all Trudeau's policies, from  multiculturalism to the creation of the Charter of Rights and Freedoms. Trudeau defined a just society before becoming the prime minister of Canada:

The phrase is now an ingrained part of Canadian political discourse.  Those on the social-democratic left consider themselves Trudeau's heirs and vigorously denounce any policy that would harm the Just Society legacy, while the neoliberal right attacks the notion that Trudeau's Canada was more "just" than other eras.

Irish usage

Notable other users of the phrase have included Irish Taoiseach Liam Cosgrave of the Fine Gael party.

See also
Civil society
Human rights
"Justice as Fairness"
Parallel society
Social liberalism
Unity in diversity

References

Further reading

Pierre Trudeau
Social justice